Aron Skrobek (14 January 1889 – murdered 21 July 1943) was a trade unionist and journalist, a member of the  Jewish Labour Bund and the Communist Party of Poland, a pre-war political prisoner of the Bereza Kartuska Prison after he fled to France from the political repression in Poland he wrote of Pilsudski regime using the pen name David Kutner.

In World War II, he was active in the French resistance in Paris. He was arrested by the French police in July 1943, handed over to the SS and executed at the Natzweiler-Struthof concentration camp.

References

1889 births
1943 deaths
French Ashkenazi Jews
Polish Ashkenazi Jews
Jews in the French resistance
French Resistance members
Yiddish culture in Poland
Inmates of Bereza Kartuska Prison
Polish people executed in Nazi concentration camps
Polish communists
Polish trade unionists